Sirotinskaya is a rural locality (a stanitsa) and the administrative center of Sirotinskoye Rural Settlement, Ilovlinsky District, Volgograd Oblast, Russia. The population was 892 as of 2010. There are 20 streets.

Geography 
Sirotinskaya is located on the right bank of the Don River, 54 km west of Ilovlya (the district's administrative centre) by road. Beluzhino-Koldairov is the nearest rural locality.

References 

Rural localities in Ilovlinsky District
Don Host Oblast